Little America is an unincorporated community in Fulton County, Illinois, United States. The community is located at the junction of Illinois Route 78 and U.S. Route 24, east of Lewistown.

References

Unincorporated communities in Fulton County, Illinois
Unincorporated communities in Illinois